James Haley (formerly believed to be Fred Haley) was a professional baseball catcher. Haley played in Major League Baseball for the Troy Trojans in 1880. In 2 games for the Trojans, Haley went hitless in 7 at bats.

External links

Major League Baseball catchers
Troy Trojans players
Year of death missing
Year of birth missing
19th-century baseball players